The National Gym Association (NGA), founded in 1979, is a 501(3)(c) non-profit organization in the USA dedicated to the betterment of all-natural bodybuilding and providing high-quality certified professional fitness training programs. In fulfilling its purpose, the NGA promotes and sanctions "all-natural" or "drug-free" professional, amateur and figure competitors with over 50 contests throughout the United States.

The NGA was founded by Andrew Bostinto a former Pro. Mr. America (Masters). Bostinto has personally trained with individuals who have won the most prestigious bodybuilding awards, including the former Mr. Olympia and Mr. Universe and Governor of California Arnold Schwarzenegger, and the former Mr. Universe and the original "Incredible Hulk", Lou Ferrigno.

The NGA board of directors and faculty staff include medical directors, PhDs, Masters in Medical Biology and Nutrition, personal trainer, and current bodybuilding champions.

References

External links 
 National Gym Association

Bodybuilding organizations
Sports organizations established in 1979